The University of Sri Jayewardenepura (also referred to as Jayewardenepura University or USJ) ( Shri Jayavardhanapura Vishvavidyala) is a public university in Sri Lanka. It is in Gangodawila, Nugegoda, near Sri Jayewardenepura Kotte, the capital city. It was formed in 1958 out of the Vidyodaya Pirivena, a Buddhist educational centre which was founded in 1873 by Ven. Hikkaduwe Sri Sumangala Thera.

History

The University of Sri Jayewardenepura has a long history dating back to 1873, when the Vidyodaya Pirivena was established by the erudite monk Venerable Ven. Hikkaduwe Sri Sumangala Thero, who established the pirivena as a center for Oriental learning.

In 1956, following a change of government with Solomon West Ridgeway Dias Bandaranaike as the prime minister and following the policy of promoting national languages and culture, it was decided to establish two new universities by conferring university status on the Vidyodaya and Vidyalankara Pirivenas. Accordingly, the Vidyodaya University and Vidyalankara University Act No. 45 of 1958 established the universities at the Vidyodyaya Pirivena at Maligakanda and the Vidyalankara Pirivena at Kelaniya. In 1958, it was reconstituted as the Vidyodaya University of Ceylon.

This road connects Colombo to Ratnapura and beyond. Part of these lands belonged to the nearby Sunethradevi Pirivena, associated with King Parakramabahu VI (1412–1467). The shift of the university to the new site was effected on 22 November 1961, under the direction of Ven. Sri Soratha Thero. The vice-chancellor invited the Department of the Government Archives to establish its archives within the campus, close to the university library, to encourage research.

In 1966, the university scene changed for the better under the Higher Education Act No. 20. Universities were open for female admission. This was not all that changed; the vice chancellor position of the universities’ were no longer restricted to be assumed by the Maha Sanga.

When Ven. Dr. Walpola Rahula Thero was the vice-chancellor, the university grew significantly in stature. When Ven. Dr. Rahula Thero left the university in 1969, linguist Prof. D. E. Hettiarachchi took over. A noted employee of at this time was Mahinda Rajapaksa, who was chairman of the United Corporations and Mercantile Union local on the campus. He was later elected as the president of Sri Lanka and acts as the prime minister to the current government.

The revitalization of the university continued until the insurgency in 1971. The political atmosphere at the time heavily affected the education of university students. Following the insurgency, the university premises was taken over by the army and converted into a detention camp for suspected insurgents during the brief period of 1971–1972.

During this period, the university managed to conduct lectures at different locations, so the students were not completely deprived of the education they deserved.

In 1972, all universities were transformed to a campus status under the University of Ceylon Act 1 of 1972. According to the act all universities were made campuses of the single university: ‘University of Sri Lanka’. In 1978 university status was restored with the next cycle of change in management of higher education.

The university's full-time student population is over 18,000, enrolled in the faculties of Applied Sciences, Engineering, Graduate Studies, Humanities and Social Sciences, Management Studies and Commerce, Medical Sciences, and Technology.

List of chancellors and vice chancellors 
The following is a list of chancellors and vice-chancellors:

Faculties 

The university first commenced its academic activities with five faculties: Buddhist studies, Philosophy, Languages, Arts, Ayurveda and Science. The five faculties worked under 22 departments. 
Today the university has eleven main faculties: Applied Sciences, Engineering, Graduate Studies, Humanities and Social Sciences, Management Studies and Commerce, Medical Sciences, Allied Health Sciences, Dental Sciences,Computing, Urban & Aquatic Bio resources, and Technology. The university has built its reputation around the Faculty of Management Studies and Commerce.

In 1962, the Department of Science was elevated to a Faculty of Applied Sciences, and G. C. N. Jayesuriya became the first dean of the faculty. The current dean of the faculty is Sudantha Liyanage, from the Department of Chemistry.

The Department of Medical Education and Health Sciences (DME&HS) was established to improve and sustain the quality of the learning/teaching processes in the faculty and to conduct certificate, diploma of degree courses in Health Sciences. Although Medical Education units are in the university system, the DME&HS is the 'first and only one' department established under the system to develop, implement and review activities related to improving the efficiency of learning/teaching related to Medical and Health Sciences. The DME&HS is successfully facilitating collaborative work in implementing medical and para-medical (Allied Health Sciences) programmes including Nursing, Pharmacy and Medical and Laboratory Science degrees.

The Postgraduate Institute of Management is a semi-autonomous body affiliated to the university. It promotes advanced education and professionalism in management in Sri Lanka through the provision of postgraduate instruction, training, research, and development in the branches of management and administrative studies.

International links

World Class University Project (WCUP) of the University of Sri Jayewardenepura 
The University Grants Commission (UGC) defines the role of WCUP as 'The implementation of a series of activities on par with international standards and to formulate and implement specific strategies to move up in the internal ranking indexes and become "world class" in order to achieve global excellence.' The focus of the WCUP is to encourage local fields that support innovation that leads to national development by prioritizing interdisciplinary studies that combine the fields of basic sciences and the humanities.

At the University of Sri Jayewardenepura the WCUP is designed to develop a research culture within the university. The project, under the leadership of Dr. Ranil De Silva, director, was established with the intention of encouraging world-class scholars and researchers to develop academic programmes and departments within the university.

The WCUP of the University of Sri Jayewardenepura has signed six international memoranda of understanding since 2013 and has initiated twelve since 2013.

Foreign Students’ Affairs 
One of the more recent developments implemented under the Foreign Students’ affairs office, chaired by Dr. Lalith Ananda, was established to provide the university students with an opportunity to gain international experience through split programmes, student-exchange programmes, study visits, etc. The office also provides an opportunity for the international community to take part in academic and research activities conducted at the university.

Research

Research council 
The research council of the University of Sri Jayewardenepura was established in 2016. The intention behind establishing the council is to facilitate high quality research. The research council comprises over 18 research centres.

The research centres were established to facilitate research projects regarding pressing issues of the country. Research awards, a research awards scheme, an editing scheme, foreign travel scheme and a publishing cost scheme have been implemented to encourage research by the university.

Institutes, units and faculties 
The university has several important institutes and units in place to further develop education.

Postgraduate Institute of Management (PIM) 
This is a semi-autonomous, self-financed body affiliated to the university under the Director, Prof. Ajantha Dharmasiri. The PIM was established in 1986 under the Universities Act 16 of 1978. It is one of the eight postgraduate institutes in Sri Lanka. It is the only higher education entity in the government sector that is ISO 9000:2008. It is a member of the Association of Advanced Collegiate Schools of Business (AACSB).

External degrees and extension course unit 
During the inception of the university in 1959 as Vidyodaya Pirivena, female students were not granted admission. The unit was first established to register women for the Bachelor of Arts External Degree Programme.

Today's external student population is 1500000 students (registered within the last 10 years).

English Language Teaching Department (ELTD) 
The ELTD is operated under the Faculty of Humanities and Social Sciences. The unit aims to improve the English proficiency of students. The unit introduced a new course in 2013 to the Faculty of Humanities and Social Studies to improve English language proficiency among the first-year students. The course was made a credit-bearing course to encourage students to pursue the learning of the language. As of 2017, the unit was renamed as the English Language Teaching Department by the UGC.

The Physical Education Division 
The physical education division of the university was established in the year 1968. The division provides facilities for 38 games. The facilities include an outdoor volleyball court, basketball courts, tennis courts, a standard-sized swimming pool complex and a cricket ground.

Staff Development Centre of the University of Sri Jayewardenepura (SDC-USJP) 
The centre focuses on uplifting the quality of employees by conducting various professional development programmes. The Centre serves all seven faculties of study, centre/ units, over 560 academics, 35 academic support staff, 37 executive staff and 20 non-academic staff.

Centre for IT Services 
The centre manages the campus-wide IT infrastructure.

The Career Guidance Unit 
Established in 1998, the centre helps produce employable graduates by facilitating them with professional guidance. The centre has initiated a gavel club which hosts an annual speech master contest, building the confidence of students. The Career Guidance Unit has also established a career skills development society which maintains several schemes: an annual job fair, J’pura employability awards ceremony, OBT Camp, "Donate Happiness Cancer Hospital project and ‘Arunella’ career guidance seminar for school children.

Sports 
University of Sri Jayewardenepura has won the Sri Lanka University games for three consecutive years. The University emerged overall champions of the 12th Sri Lanka University Games, organized by Wayaba University of Sri Lanka in 2016. This was the first time in the history a university was able to achieve this award.

The university has also produced the first undergraduate to participate in the Olympic games representing the country. Sumedha Ranasinghe of the university took part in the Rio Olympics 2016 with the intention of bringing glory to his motherland.

Historically related institution
The Vidyalankara University was created at the same time as the Vidyodaya University. Today Vidyalankara University is known as the University of Kelaniya.

References

External links 
 

 
1958 establishments in Ceylon
Educational institutions established in 1958
Statutory boards of Sri Lanka
Universities in Sri Lanka